Andrew Sewnauth (born 26 February 1982, in Glasgow) is a Scottish field hockey player, who was a member of the national squad that finished 8th in the 2003 European Nations Cup in Barcelona and won the 2003 Celtic Cup. The defender plays for Western Wildcats, and has won six Scottish National League titles.

A specialist penalty taker and slip flicker, he is the current captain of Western Wildcats his only ever hockey club.

References

1982 births
Living people
Scottish male field hockey players
Field hockey players from Glasgow